The 1986 Campeonato Paulista da Primeira Divisão de Futebol Profissional was the 85th season of São Paulo's top professional football league. Inter de Limeira won the championship by the first time.  Comercial and Paulista were relegated.

Championship
The twenty teams of the championship would all play twice against each other, with the best teams of each half and the two overall best teams qualifying to the Semifinals, and the bottom two teams being relegated.

First phase

Semifinals

|}

Finals

|}

References

Campeonato Paulista seasons
Paulista